The Cleveland Cavaliers are an American professional basketball team based in Cleveland, Ohio. The Cavaliers play in the Central Division of the Eastern Conference in the National Basketball Association (NBA). The team joined the NBA in 1970 as an expansion team and won their first Eastern Conference championship in 2007. The Cavaliers have played their home games at Rocket Mortgage FieldHouse, formerly known as Quicken Loans Arena and Gund Arena, since 1994. The Cavaliers are owned by Dan Gilbert, with Koby Altman as their general manager. American R&B-pop singer Usher Raymond is a minority owner.

There have been 23 head coaches for the Cavaliers franchise. The franchise's first head coach was Bill Fitch, who coached for nine seasons. Fitch is the franchise's all-time leader for the most regular-season games coached (738); Lenny Wilkens is the franchise's all-time leader for the most regular-season game wins (316); Mike Brown is the franchise's all-time leader for the most playoff games coached (71) and the most playoff-game wins (42). David Blatt has the highest regular-season winning percentage (.675) and the highest playoff winning percentage (.700). Tyronn Lue is the only coach to lead the Cavaliers to an NBA championship, in 2016. Chuck Daly, Wilkens and Fitch have been elected into the Basketball Hall of Fame as head coaches, partly due to their work with the Cavaliers. Fitch, Daly and Wilkens were also named as 3 of the top 10 coaches in NBA history. Fitch and Brown are the only Cavaliers coaches to have won the NBA Coach of the Year Award.

Key

Coaches

Notes
 A running total of the number of coaches of the Cavaliers. Thus, any coach who has two or more separate terms as head coach is only counted once.
 Each year is linked to an article about that particular NBA season.

References
General

Specific

Lists of National Basketball Association head coaches by team

Head coaches